Una Rosa Blu (A Blu(e) Rose) is the seventh studio album by Mexican pop singer-songwriter Gloria Trevi, released by Univision Records on October 2, 2007 (see 2007 in music) in Latin America and the United States. It was produced by Sergio George, Bob Benozzo and Armando Avila. This album sold over 2.000,000 copies. In the US, the album sold about 50,000 copies during the first day of release [4] 1 and later received gold and platinum certifications by the RIAA (Recording Industry Association of America) .2 In Mexico, it received Gold Record and Platinum and reached fifth place in sales nationwide. Una Rosa Blu reached a highest position of third place on the Billboard Latin Pop Albums, within a few weeks of its release. In Spain it was one of the Top 100 best selling albums in 2009.
Promoting Una Rosa Blu was accompanied by five simple: Psicofonias, Cinco Minutos, Pruebamelo, El Favor De La Soledad and Lo Que Una Chica Por Amor Es Capaz which were published during 2007 and 2009. These courts reached the top five radio stations in popularity in Mexico and Latin America
Renowned producer Sergio George was nominated for a Latin Grammy Awards in 2009 in the category "Producer of the Year" for his work on the subject's life is going, track number 6 on Una Rosa Blu, and other productions with various artists. Armando Avila, who produced most of the songs, was recognized as "Producer of the Year" at the Billboard Latin Music Awards in April 2010.

Track listing

Singles

Charts

Sales and certifications

References

2007 albums
Gloria Trevi albums
Spanish-language albums
Albums produced by Sergio George